Dyckia tobatiensis is a plant species of the genus Dyckia, native to Paraguay.

References
 GBIF entry
 Encyclopedia of Life entry
 FCBS Bromeliad Species Online Database entry

tobatiensis
Flora of Paraguay